Albussac is a commune in the Corrèze department in the Nouvelle-Aquitaine region of central France.

The inhabitants of the commune are known as Albussacois or Albussacoises

The commune has been awarded one flower by the National Council of Towns and Villages in Bloom in the Competition of cities and villages in Bloom.

Geography
Albussac is located south-west of the Massif Central about 500m above sea level. It has an oceanic climate with temperatures ranging from 25 °C to 30 °C in summer and 9 °C in winter with periods of frequent cold waves in January and February (often -10 to -12 °C at sunrise and no more than 3 °C to 0 °C at 3pm). Albussac has regular snowfalls in winter with 20 cm of snow common.

The Roanne has its source in the commune.

Albussac is located some 100 km south-east of Limoges and 20 km east of Brive-la-Gaillarde.  It can be accessed by the D921 road which comes from Beynat in the west and continues east through the commune and the village and continues to Saint-Chamant. There is also the D87 road branching off the D940 just south of Sainte-Fortunade and coming through the northern border of the commune and south-east to the village. There is a network of country roads in the commune and numerous hamlets and villages. These are:

Aubiat
Bedaine
Chanterel
Chastrusse
Jassat
La Commanderie
La Salesse
Lachaud
Lafage
Laumond
Laverne
Le Bros-Bas
Le Bros-Haut
Le Mas
Les Quatre-Routes
Madelbos
Malmaury
Prezat
Roche-de-Vic
Roussanne
Teillol

The Ruisseau de la Font Blanc rises in the south of the commune which flows north gathering several tributaries and joining the Ruisseau de Rochette flowing from the west continuing north-east to join the Valeine at the edge of the commune. The Valeine also flows from the west north of the village gathering numerous tributaries in the commune and continuing to the east. There is also the Ruisseau de Mejeu forming part of the northern border flowing east to join the Souvigne.
In the west an unnamed stream flows north-west forming the western border of the commune and joins the Ruisseau de la Grande.

Neighbouring communes and villages

Heraldry

Administration

List of Successive Mayors of Albussac

Population

Sites and Monuments
The Church of Saint Martin (12th century) is registered as an historical monument. The Church contains two items which are registered as historical objects:
A Cross: Christ on the Cross (Middle Ages)
A Bronze Bell (1625)
The Murel Waterfall
A Lime tree called "Sully" is more than 400 years old and one of the last in the Limousin region.
Roche de Vic is a former Gallic oppidum that dominated the region.

Notable People linked to the commune
Yvon Bourdet, writer. He evoked Albussac in his book: In Praise of Patois or the Itinerary of an Occitan
Emmanuel Berl, journalist and essayist, lived in the town during the Second World War at a place called La Malmaurie with his wife, the singer Mireille

See also
Communes of the Corrèze department
Cantons of the Corrèze department
Arrondissements of the Corrèze department

Bibliography
Doctor Albert Massonie: Old Times in Albussac, Tulle, 1990

References

External links
Albussac on the old National Geographic Institute website 
Albußac on the 1750 Cassini Map

Communes of Corrèze